Bujang Lapok Kembali Daa, or The Return of the Three Bachelors is a 1986 Malaysia comedy film directed, written and acted in by Aziz Sattar. In this film, P. Ramlee's son, Nasir (1953-2008) took over his late father's place in the trio. This would be the fifth and last installment of Bujang Lapok film series.

Cast
 Aziz Sattar as Aziz
 S. Shamsuddin as Sudin
 Nasir P.Ramlee as Nasir
 Datuk Mahmud June (Supporting Actor)
 Norlida Ahmad (Supporting Actress)
 Norakma Yunos (Supporting Actress)
 M. Rajoli (Supporting Actor)
 M. Fauzi (Supporting Actor)
 Rose Hazira Hashim (Supporting Actress)
 A. R Ayappan (Supporting Actor)

External links
 Bujang Lapok Kembali Daa at Sinemamalaysia.com

Malaysian comedy films
Malay-language films
1986 films
1986 comedy films
Malaysian satirical films